Camp Kinderland is a summer camp located in Tolland, Massachusetts for people aged eight through sixteen.  The camp's motto is summer camp with a conscience since 1923.  The main topics of the curriculum are: equality, peace, community, social justice, activism, civil rights, Yiddishkeit, and friendship.  Campers may stay for four weeks in July, three weeks in August, or all seven of the offered weeks. There is also a two-week session available for first-time campers in the youngest group.

Founding and history 
Kinderland was founded by members of The Workmen's Circle/Arbeter Ring, a leftist Jewish fraternal organization, in 1923 in Hopewell Junction, New York.  Camp Kinderland, along with the rest of the left wing of the Workmen's Circle, split off in 1930 and created the International Workers Order and became the official summer camp of the Jewish section of the International Workers Order. In 1954, the IWO was shut down and its assets liquidated by the government, which had determined that it was a Communist organization. At that time, Camp Kinderland became an independent corporation.
Camp Kinderland is now a multicultural summer camp and community. While campers come from around the US, many are from the New York area, especially Brooklyn, where there is a kindershule, or secular school.

Social values
Camp Kinderland promotes progressive social values through its cultural program. It is anti-death penalty, pro-labor union, and generally socialist. Every year it holds the Peace Olympics, where camp is evenly divided into four teams, each representing a movement or nation that the camp's directors feel is advancing the progressive cause.

Politics
The camp's left-wing politics led it to be the place many red diaper babies were sent growing up, which caused it to be investigated during the McCarthy era.

Notable Kinderland alumni 
 Spencer Ackerman, progressive blogger
 Chesa Boudin, lawyer and activist; San Francisco District Attorney.
 Lawrence Bush, editor, Jewish Currents
 Jules Dassin, film director
 Delia Graff Fara, philosopher of language
 Ted Gold, a member of Weatherman Underground
 Katie Halper, podcaster
 Max Kellerman, sports commentator
 Michael Klonsky, education policy expert
 Harvey Kurtzman, cartoonist and founder of Mad Magazine
 Ivy Meeropol, documentary filmmaker, granddaughter of Julius and Ethel Rosenberg
 Marky Ramone, drummer, The Ramones, Misfits
 Suze Rotolo, artist and teacher
 Ben Shuldiner, 2006 Democratic candidate for New York's 19th Congressional District
 Paul Stanley, singer and guitarist, KISS
 Sol Stern, senior fellow, Manhattan Institute
 Marisa Tomei, actress
 Merritt Wever, actress

See also
 Itche Goldberg (brief mention of shules)
 Camp Boiberik

Footnotes

Further reading
 Katie Halper and Michael Lerner, "Commie Camp: A Documentary about Camp Kinderland," Tikkun Daily, Aug. 8, 2013.
 Dina Kraft, "Canoes, Campfires, Yiddish, and Communist Roots," Haaretz, Aug. 13, 2012.

External links
 Official camp website
 Camp Kinderland Alumni Association
 Camp Kinderland Records, online finding aid, Tamiment Library, New York University.

Ashkenazi Jewish culture in Massachusetts
Jewish anti-Zionism in the United States
Kinderland
Youth organizations based in New York (state)
Youth organizations based in Massachusetts
Buildings and structures in Hampden County, Massachusetts
Bundism in North America
Tourist attractions in Dutchess County, New York
Buildings and structures in Dutchess County, New York
Yiddish culture in the United States
1923 establishments in New York (state)